Nataf is a surname. Notable people with the surname include:

 Igor-Alexandre Nataf (born 1978), French chess player
 Mallaury Nataf (born 1972), French singer and actress
 Robert Nataf, French chemist